Monellan Castle was a large castellated mansion on the southern outskirts of The Cross, a hamlet just outside Killygordon in the east of County Donegal in Ulster, the northern province in Ireland. It was constructed in the eighteenth century for the  Delap family, an Ulster-Scots family who acquired the estate in the late eighteenth century. The family also owned estates in Buckinghamshire in England. The Monellan Burn, also known as the Creamery Burn, runs along the western and north-western edge of the former demesne surrounding Monellan Castle, flowing into the River Finn very near The Cross. The burn separated the Monellan Castle Demesne from the adjacent townland of Ballynaman (sometimes written as Ballinamana).

During the 1930s, the castle and its estate was acquired by the Irish Land Commission which redistributed the land to local tenant farmers, as was the policy at the time. The castle was then, with support from the Irish Government, demolished.

References 

Sources
Hughes, Les. "A young Australian pioneer: Henry Mundy."
Monellan Castle Retrieved 4 January 2011.

Castles in County Donegal